In shogi, Bishop Exchange Rushing Silver (角換わり早繰り銀 kakugawari hayakurigin) is a Bishop Exchange opening that uses a Rushing Silver attacking formation with the right silver.

Rushing Silver has the silver positioned above the line of pawn on the fourth file if played by Black or the sixth file if played by White.

The name Rushing Silver was also translated as Rapid Advancing Silver by Tomohide Kawasaki (also known as Hidetchi).

See also

 Bishop Exchange
 Bishop Exchange Reclining Silver
 Bishop Exchange Climbing Silver
 Tempo Loss Bishop Exchange
 Wrong Diagonal Bishop Exchange
 Static Rook

Bibliography

External links

 HIDETCHI's YouTube videos:
 Bishop Exchange #1
 Bishop Exchange #2
 Bishop Exchange #3
 Yamajunn's Basic Shogi Opening: Kakugawari
 Shogi Shack: Bishop Exchanged Hayakuri Gin
 Yamajunn's Shogi Opening Traps:
 Hayakuri Gin In Ittezon Kakugawari Part 1
 Hayakuri Gin In Ittezon Kakugawari Part 2
 Yet Another Shogi Site: Normal Bishop Exchange: Sente Rapid Advancing Silver
 Quest of the Lost Systems: 
 Kakugawari 1: Hayaguri-gin
 Kakugawari 2: Hayaguri-gin
 Kakugawari 3: Hayaguri-gin

Shogi openings
Bishop Exchange openings